Yu Hui Tseng is a Chinese tea master. She is the only female master and among the ten most recognised today. She is also currently the only tea master active outside of China. She is the founder and owner of La Maison des Trois Thés tea salon in Paris.

Biography
Born in a family descending from Zengzi, Yu Hui Tseng started studying the piano aged four, and later took up the clarinet at a professional level, earning a first prize in Taiwan at 17. In parallel, she studied the Gongfu tea ceremony with Master Zhang Tian Fu.

Career
Maître Tseng uses her knowledge and experience to try to change the image tea has for many people in France and other western countries. Maître Tseng is known for her informed exchange of ideas with top wine experts like Philippe Faure-Brac, Richard Geoffroy and Jean-Claude Berrouet. Tseng is also consulted by many Michelin-starred chefs in Paris like Alain Senderens, Guy Savoy, Joël Robuchon, Olivier Roellinger and Pierre Gagnaire. She provides them with appropriate tea varieties for their restaurants and also helps them find the right flavours and scents to accompany their dishes. She also often collaborates with pastry chefs and chocolatiers, such as Jacques Génin and Pierre Hermé, sommeliers like Andreas Larrson and Patrick Borras, as well as master cheese makers, spice masters, whiskey-makers and even perfumers. Her unique skills are also useful for companies like Nestlé Waters who trust her taste and "nose" for their products. Likewise, in 2017 Master Tseng endorsed the world's first Tea Humidor, by Lotusier, and performed a tea-tasting session at its Spring press launch in London.

La Maison des Trois Thés
In 1995, she opened La Maison des Trois Thés in Paris at 1 rue Saint-Médard, where she keeps one of the largest tea cellars in the world, with over 1000 selections of tea, some of them older than a 100 years, and sometimes costing significantly more than even the most prized and grand French wines, like Château Pétrus, Romanée-Conti, or anything from the cellars of Dom Pérignon. In her tea salon, she stores and ages tea varieties in specially designed chambers, for optimal temperature and humidity control.

Tseng is known to be a perfectionist when it comes to tea conditions and conservation, but also when it comes to tea appreciation, going as far as demanding from customers not to wear strong fragrances when they come for tea tastings.

References 

  Maître Tseng : le goût, un plaisir en mouvement

Chinese expatriates in France
Chinese tea masters
Living people
Year of birth missing (living people)